Season in Salzburg may refer to:

 Season in Salzburg (operetta), an Austrian operetta by Kurt Feltz
 Season in Salzburg (1952 film), an Austrian film adaptation
 Season in Salzburg (1961 film), an Austrian film adaptation